CJRB is a Canadian radio station broadcasting an easy listening/oldies format at 1220 AM. Licensed to Boissevain, Manitoba, it serves the Westman Region. It first began broadcasting in October 1973. The station is currently owned by Golden West Broadcasting.

CJRB is the only station in Canada which broadcasts on 1220 kHz; 1220 AM is a Mexican clear-channel frequency. CJRB is a Class B station.

References

External links
CJRB Radio 1220
Golden West Corporate Website - Manitoba Radio
 

Jrb
Jrb
Radio stations established in 1973
1973 establishments in Manitoba